Rudy Trouvé (born 28 January 1967 in Wilrijk) is a Belgian musician from Antwerp.
In the early nineties he founded the Heavenhotel record label and released dozens of records since. Between 1993 and 1995 he was part of Deus, quitting the band in favour of focusing on his own solo career, exploring obscure music groups and temporary collaborations.

Since 1995, he scored most success with Kiss My Jazz and Dead Man Ray, and recorded a split album with Lou Barlow on the Sub Rosa label.

Rudy Trouvé is regarded highly as an improvisor; in jam sessions and experimental concerts he has shared the stage with Mauro Pawlowski, Zeitkratzer Ensemble (Germany), Marc Ribot (US), Pierre Bastien, Pierre Berthet, members of DAAU, Zita Swoon, among others.

As a former student at St-Lucas in Ghent, Rudy Trouvé is also famous for his artwork: figurative paintings and blow-ups which can be found on the record sleeves of most of his self-produced records and the bands he performed with.  One of them was Worst Case Scenario by dEUS.

See also 
In Docs Place Friday Evening, 1996, Knitting Factory
In Coffee We Trust, 1996, Knitting Factory
In the Lost Souls Convention, 1997, Heaven Hotel
In a Service Station, 1999, Heaven Hotel

Selected discography
Rudy Trouvé / Lou Barlow – Subsonic 6 (Split album, 2000)
Rudy Trouvé – Une Chanson (EP, 2002)
Rudy Trouvé – 1999 – 2002  Rather quiet songs (2002)
Rudy Trouvé – Cartoon Moon (EP, 2002)
The Rudy Trouvé Sextet – 2002 – 2003 a.k.a. In an introvert but danceable mood (2004)
The Rudy Trouvé Sextet – Tu Sais a.k.a. The French EP (EP 2004 ltd. 100 copies)
Rudy and The Unforgettable Wally's – We met on an airport and went through tape (CDR 2007)
The Rudy Trouvé Septet – Songs and Stuff Recorded Between 2003 and 2007 Part One (2007)
The Rudy Trouvé Septet – Songs and Stuff Recorded Between 2003 and 2007 Part Two (2009)
The Rudy Trouvé Septet – Allright (EP, 2009)
The Rudy Trouvé Septet – 2007 – 2009 (2009)

Band history
 Dead Man Ray
 dEUS
 Gore Slut
 Kiss My Jazz
 The Love Substitutes
 Rudy Trouvé Sextet/Septet
 Rudy and the Unforgettable Wally's

References

External links
 http://www.deadbeattown.com/
 http://www.heavenhotel.be/

1967 births
Living people
People from Wilrijk
Belgian rock guitarists
Album-cover and concert-poster artists
Belgian record producers
Deus (band) members